WUUB (106.3 FM) is a radio station broadcasting a sports format. Licensed to serve Jupiter, Florida, United States, the station is owned by Good Karma Broadcasting, LLC. The station is also broadcast on HD radio.  The station's studios are in West Palm Beach and the transmitter tower is in Riviera Beach.

History
Prior to January 2007, 106.3 FM was known as WJBW, and between January 2007 and December 2011, it was known as WNEW-FM. Despite these call letter changes, the station's branding remained "B106.3".

The WNEW call letters were formerly the call letters for New York City radio stations WNEW AM (now WBBR) and WNEW-FM, as well as New York City television station WNEW-TV (now WNYW). CBS Radio, who also owns WWFS, "warehoused" the WNEW calls to WJBW in January 2007.

On December 1, 2011, WNEW changed their call letters to WHFS, in effect doing the same "warehousing" move for those call letters, which were tied to long-running alternative rock stations in three different incarnations in the Baltimore and Washington, DC markets in the 60s, 70s, 80s, 90s, and early 2000s. As with the case with WNEW-FM, the station kept the "B106.3" branding under WHFS.

On April 10, 2012, CBS Radio announced that it was selling WHFS and its sister stations to Palm Beach Broadcasting for $50 million, pending FCC approval. The station's Urban Adult Contemporary format and airstaff will be retained under the new owners; however, under the terms of the deal, the WHFS call sign will remain within the ownership of CBS Radio, requiring the station to change its call letters once more. In addition, the station, as well as WAXY-FM, will be spun off to comply with Federal Communications Commission (FCC) ownership rules. The WHFS call letters were moved to former sister station WSJT on August 2, 2012, as that station launched a new sports talk format. B106.3 adopted the new WUUB call letters on the same day.

On February 26, 2013, it was widely reported in the 'trades' that Good Karma Broadcasting, owners of ESPN Radio affiliate WEFL (760 AM), in West Palm Beach, was purchasing WUUB to bring an FM outlet to the area.  Under terms of an agreement between CBS and Palm Beach Broadcasting, the sale to Good Karma was allowed. The format change to sports took place on February 26, 2013, at 5p.m. The purchase by Good Karma was consummated on April 17, 2013, at a purchase price of $2.4 million.

Programming
WUUB, a.k.a. "B106.3", formerly carried an Urban Adult Contemporary format playing R&B and soul music.  It carried two syndicated shows:  The Tom Joyner Morning Show and Love, Lust and Lies with Michael Baisden in the afternoons.  B-106.3 also brought gospel programming on Sunday mornings and Classic Soul on Sunday afternoons.  After the format switch, former sister station WMBX (X102.3) broadened its format from rhythmic to urban contemporary and added more R&B.

As an ESPN Radio affiliate, the station carries local shows hosted by Josh Cohen, Ken LaVicka, Evan Cohen, JMP, and Cyrus Wittig. The station offers extensive play-by-play of local sports teams, ranging from high school football to the NFL.

Previous logo

References

External links

UUB
Sports radio stations in the United States
Radio stations established in 1993
1993 establishments in Florida
ESPN Radio stations